Coregonus baicalensis is a species of freshwater whitefish in the family Salmonidae. It is endemic to the Russian Federation's Lake Baikal where it is found on the bottom demersal. The average length is a few centimetres above . It is also known as the Baikal whitefish. It is frequently considered to be a subspecies of Coregonus lavaretus.

References
 

baicalensis
Taxa named by Benedykt Dybowski
Fish described in 1874
Fish of Lake Baikal